Garth and Van Road railway station served the village of Garth, in the historical county of Montgomeryshire, Wales, from 1873 to 1940 on the Van Railway.

History 
The station was opened on 1 December 1873 by the Van Railway. It closed to passengers in July 1879, although there were excursions in 1880 and the schoolchildren continued to be taken to school. It closed to goods on 1 November 1940.

References 

Disused railway stations in Powys
Railway stations in Great Britain opened in 1873
Railway stations in Great Britain closed in 1879
1873 establishments in Wales
1940 disestablishments in Wales